As of 2015, Latin is the first foreign language into which the Tirukkuṟaḷ was translated. There are three known translations of the Kural text available in Latin.

History
The Christian missionaries who arrived in India during the British era admired the Kural text greatly owing to the moral values found in the work. In 1730, Constantius Joseph Beschi of the Society of Jesus (1700–1742) translated it into Latin, introducing the work to the Europeans for the first time. Beschi, however, translated only the first two parts, namely, virtue and wealth, since he considered translating the section on love inappropriate for a Christian missionary. This manuscript, now found in the India Office Library, London, was edited by George Uglow Pope, who published it as 'notes' at the end of his famous English translation titled The Sacred Kurral in 1886. This saved the manuscript from having been lost in the oblivion. There are at least two more Latin translations of the Kural text available either in full or in parts. In 1856, Karl Graul published the Kural text in German, with later translated it into Latin and simple Tamil in 1865. In 1865, an unknown author made the third Latin translation of the Kural text titled Tiruvalluvar Kural Versione Lationa.

Translations

Criticisms on translations
Modern scholars have noticed several mistranslations in the Latin translation by Father Beshi. According to V. Ramasamy, "Beschi is purposely distorting the message of the original when he renders பிறவாழி as ‘the sea of miserable life’ and the phrase பிறவிப்பெருங்கடல் as ‘sea of this birth’ which has been translated by others as ‘the sea of many births’. Beschi means thus ‘those who swim the vast sea of miseries’. The concept of rebirth or many births for the same soul is contrary to Christian principle and belief".

See also
 Tirukkural translations
 List of Tirukkural translations by language

References

Published translations
 Karl Graul (Trans.). (1865). Kural of Tiruvalluver. High-Tamil Text with Translation into Common Tamil and Latin, Notes and Glossary. (Bibliotheca Tamulica sive Opera Praecipia Tamuliensium, Volume 4). Leipzig: F. A. Brockhaus. 348 pages. (Digitalisat)

Further reading
 Pope, G. U. (1886). The Sacred Kurral of Tiruvalluva Nayanar (with Latin Translation By Fr. Beschi) (Original in Tamil with English and Latin Translations). New Delhi: Asian Educational Services, pp. i-xxviii, 408
 Department of Tamil Development. (2000). திருக்குறள் நூல்கள் (Thirukkural Books). Chennai: International Institute of Tamil Studies, p. 15

Latin
Translations into Latin